The 2000–01 WNBL season was the 21st season of competition since its establishment in 1981. A total of 8 teams contested the league.

Team standings

Finals

Season award winners

Statistics leaders

References

 https://web.archive.org/web/20141227122005/http://www.wnbl.com.au/fileadmin/user_upload/Media_Guide/12284_BASKAUST_WNBL_MEDIA_GUIDE_2014-15_BACK.pdf

2000-01
2000–01 in Australian basketball
Aus
basketball
basketball